Hank Duncan (né Henry James Duncan; 26 October 1894 – 7 June 1968) was an American dixieland jazz pianist born in Bowling Green, Kentucky, probably better known for his work with Fess Williams, King Oliver, Tommy Ladnier, Sidney Bechet, Charles "Fat Man" Turner, and many others. He also toured extensively with Fats Waller.  Duncan was sometimes referred to as "The Little Man From Memory Lane." He died in Long Island, New York.

Selected discography 

 Black & White 31 (78 rpm)Hank Duncan TrioRecorded June 7, 1944, New YorkBingie Madison (clarinet, tenor sax), Hank Duncan (piano), Goldie Lucas (drums)Side A: "I Gave You My Word"Matrix BW16Side B: "Maple Leaf Rag"Scott Joplin (music)Matrix BW13
 Black & White 32 (78 rpm)Hank Duncan TrioRecorded June 7, 1944, New YorkBingie Madison (clarinet, tenor sax), Hank Duncan (piano), Goldie Lucas (drums)Side A: "Changes Always On My Mind"Hank Duncan (music)Matrix BW15Side B: "Upbeat"Bingie Madison (music)Matrix BW14

References

1894 births
1968 deaths
American jazz pianists
American male pianists
Dixieland jazz musicians
20th-century American pianists
20th-century American male musicians
American male jazz musicians